On November 5, 2021, a fatal crowd crush occurred during the first night of the 2021 Astroworld Festival, a music event founded by American rapper Travis Scott that was held at NRG Park in Houston, Texas. Eight people died on the night of the concert, and two more died in the hospital over the following days. The cause of death for all ten was ruled to be accidental compressive asphyxiation, with one of the ten affected by the additional influence of a toxic combination of drugs and alcohol. Twenty-five people were hospitalized, and more than 300 people were treated for injuries at the festival's field hospital. Multiple concertgoers documented the incident, posting videos and recounting their experiences on social media.

Background 

The Astroworld Festival is an annual music event founded by American rapper Travis Scott in 2018, taking its name from his third studio album released the same year. The event was organized and managed by Live Nation and its affiliates. Apple Music streamed Scott's performance live.

Preparations 
The 2021 festival was planned for two consecutive nights. Tickets were sold out in under an hour upon going on sale in May, and 100,000 in total were expected to attend. Authorities initially planned to limit attendees to 70,000 the first night, and that was reduced to 50,000 closer to the event, even though city fire codes permitted 200,000 people. The city of Houston and Harris County organized security for the event, with both mayor Sylvester Turner and General Manager for NRG Park Mark Miller claiming more than 1,000 security staff and police were present, more than double the total from the prior Astroworld concert, with the city specifically providing more security for the festival than it had for the 2021 World Series, which had ended in Houston three days earlier. Inquiries to verify those numbers from the Houston Chronicle as of December 3 were declined. NRG Park, owned and managed by the Harris County Sports & Convention Corporation (HCSCC), also had expanded upon the previous year's setup by two new gates and expanded room for crowd traffic flow around the 'Yellow Lot' parking area on which the festival was held, one of a series of them that surround NRG Arena, according to Miller on November 17. Despite the NRG campus being on county property, with local jurisdiction laws, the city of Houston and its fire marshal had the final say on the festival's permits, approving all ten regarding pyrotechnics, street closures, food safety, gas and electrical usage, and other contingencies, but Houston Police Department (HPD) Chief Troy Finner said on November 10 his department had no part in the writing or agreements of the original contract. Parking staff requested that HPD close two major thoroughfares outside the complex beginning November 3 in order to avoid property destruction and stampedes similar to those seen in 2018 and 2019, with no word as of November 10 on whether the request was granted.

Concerns about the "ratio of guests to staff" were repeatedly made weeks in advance of the event by GM Mark Miller, which Live Nation subsidiary ScoreMore Shows, an Austin-based concert promoter in charge of the concert, offered to remedy with its own supplemental staff, but Harris County had exclusive agreements for NRG Park with crowd management and event security contractor Contemporary Services Corporation (CSC). As a result, on November 4, Harris County officials signed an amendment to the contract with ScoreMore for the promoter to provide more staff of its choosing. Prior to this, officials had never amended the contract. Seyth Boardman, co-founder of live entertainment risk management company B3 Risk Solutions, contracted by showrunners Live Nation and ScoreMore for Astroworld as its safety and risk director, was also a longtime manager at CSC, resulting in conflicts of interest on budgetary issues, staffing, and security protocol.

The initial version of the event operations plan prepared by ScoreMore contained eventualities such as deaths, traumatic injuries, severe weather, an active shooter, civil unrest, lost persons, missing children, and unruly fans. However, it did not contain plans for a surging crowd or mosh pit safety, nor the gate breach at the prior Astroworld Festival, or other security issues at Scott's concerts. Despite reports of subsequent revisions, HCSCC claimed to have never obtained them prior to the event. One lawsuit against Apple Music claimed that early reports pointed to the placement of the streamer's camera team and equipment surrounding the venue's quadrant barriers that split the premises horizontally and vertically, arguing that this planning decision cut off concertgoers' means of dispersal and/or exit in favor of better vantage points for the cameras. Multiple ticket purchasers said that their wristbands—which came last-minute in the mail—were accompanied by neither an invoice nor a brochure for directions or best practices, while others were lost in transit entirely.

At the time of the incident, the head of risk management for security personnel, the security director, the interior and exterior security directors, and the company they all worked for were not listed in the Texas Department of Public Safety's private security license database. In a document obtained by CNN, the chain of command indicated the concert's executive producer and its festival director were the only people authorized to stop the concert, but the report did not specify who held those roles. Specific crowd control techniques to spot or prevent problematic behavior were also not detailed in the document.

HPD claimed to have 528 on-duty officers at the festival, including 367 for the night shift and 161 held over from the day, and early reporting indicated that event organizer Live Nation provided another 755 security officers, including 505 event security staff, 91 armed private security officers and 76 off-duty officers from HPD paid privately, but all of those totals were later called into question, with no secondary verification of these numbers as of November 18. HPD Chief Troy Finner disputed Live Nation's totals specifically, given what he described as poor record-keeping from the three to four security companies under their purview. Paramedical needs were covered by ParaDocs Worldwide, a contractor from Brooklyn, New York, which established a main medical tent and smaller aid stations around the venue.

Early reporting indicated the Houston Fire Department (HFD) stationed twenty ambulances outside the venue ahead of the concert, but Houston Professional Fire Fighters Association (HPFFA) President Marty Lancton later disputed that total, saying there were none of his personnel were inside the venue as it was owned by the county, and that the HPFFA only had four staff members on standby outside. Early reporting estimates from HFD officials indicated around 50 ParaDocs personnel, but ParaDocs CEO Alex Pollak later disputed that total, saying they had 70 on the ground and clarified they did not own any ambulances, but that five to seven were separately contracted to serve Astroworld. As only NRG-exclusive vendors could be used for ambulance needs per the event's license, HFD logs at 1:21 p.m. indicated all five of the Harris County's Emergency Corps ambulances were already being used for the event, which had to be supplemented by another private ambulance company that was an exclusive NRG vendor.

Previous incidents

Contractors 
Live Nation had been linked to at least 200 deaths and 750 injuries at its events in seven countries since 2006. From 2016 to 2019, they had also been cited for at least ten OSHA violations, fined for several more serious incidents, and sued civilly at least once for a concert incident. ParaDocs and CSC have been the subjects of multiple recent or ongoing lawsuits seeking damages for deaths and/or injuries at concerts staffed by their personnel.

Darius Williams, a former CSC employee, told TMZ on November 9 that his Level 2 security officer licensing exam the day before had been brief and open book, with answers provided by the instructor. He said that he quit the morning of the event upon realizing they were understaffed and not equipped to handle the crowds, with several coworkers he spoke with voicing similar concerns. He later added to CNN the little urgency he sensed from supervisors upon raising concerns about rumors of a likely gate rush he had read and heard from colleagues and friends, which was only answered with an offer to change location positions on the property.

Three people that worked for ScoreMore prior to the incident told Rolling Stone on November 13 about what they described as a disorganized, cost-cutting, and unprofessional past concert work environment, and were surprised that it took them "this long to fuck up this badly." One detailed an assault by the then assistant to the president and the pocketing of box office cash; another described cost-cutting on the height of perimeter fencing and workers' holding them up as they were being crashed at past concerts, and the third detailed mid-concert bulk water purchases as attendees were passing out.

NRG Park 
A little less than two weeks earlier at NRG Park, similar circumstances occurred at American rapper Playboi Carti's concert on October 23, causing it to be canceled. Pictures and videos shared on social media showed split metal detectors, rushing of checkpoints, fans on top of cars, and at least one witness statement to the press indicating an ambulance was called for someone who had been trampled, but as of November 11, no details regarding that allegation had been released.

Travis Scott 
In Scott's previous performances, a number of legal issues, including his incitement of incidents and praising fans for their participation, were raised. Leading a new micro-generation of trap artists in 2013 bringing punk-rock nihilism to live hip hop, Scott was quoted in several outlets at the time as wanting to bring his childhood fantasy of becoming a professional wrestler to his concerts. Building his reputation with an event that CNN said teetered on the brink of chaos, a Complex review in 2015 entitled "I Tried Not to Die at Travi$ Scott and Young Thug's Show Last Night" called it "the most dangerous safe haven" and "a turnt-up fight for survival."

At Lollapalooza in 2015, Scott was charged with disorderly conduct after inciting concertgoers to ignore security and rush the stage. In 2017, he was arrested for similar conduct after a performance in Arkansas at the Walmart Arkansas Music Pavilion. He was again charged with disorderly conduct and received additional charges for inciting a riot and endangering the welfare of a minor. All charges were later dismissed, with the exception of disorderly conduct, which Scott would plead guilty to. That same year, a fan sued Scott and the organizers of a concert at Terminal 5 in New York City after falling from the third level balcony and being dragged on stage, leaving the fan paralyzed from injuries sustained in the fall, with the lawsuit blaming the fall on a crowd surge. At the same concert, Scott was recorded encouraging other fans to jump off balconies, claiming that the crowd beneath them would catch them. In 2019, three people were injured as a crowd rushed to enter the compound at Astroworld. In late 2020, music executive Irving Azoff said that while he would remain an advisor to Live Nation for Scott's tours, he had dropped him as a client, describing Scott as unmanageable.

On November 8, 2021, TMZ reported a promotional video for Astroworld which played up the apparent danger of attending the festival, with spliced news clips hyping the prior years' chaos, had been removed from their social media accounts except for Instagram. Photos on Scott's personal Instagram with his comments glorifying and glamorizing fans that had broken their hands or passed out had still not been taken down. The outlet editorialized in both cases that Scott's "rager" persona and the Astroworld brand that supported it had caught up with them.

Incident

Build-up 
At 5:00 a.m. fans began to line up at the festival's outer perimeter. At 6:15 a.m., more than 100 people that responded by text to an online posting requesting security guards showed up in all black to the parking grounds, some of whom claimed they were posted instantly with identifying vests at the main gate with no request for public safety license registration, any training, nor background checks, despite its requirements for the lowest-level security in Texas. At 7:00 a.m. In the planning documents, a second incident command post existed in the Purple Lot which was near the Main Chills stage. HFD chief Sam Peña explained after the event that its existence was not known to him at the time so no firefighters were posted there, with no confirmation as to HPD's position there either.

At 8:15 a.m. HFD received a call from a police lieutenant requesting riot gear due to the crowd's behavior at the security perimeter. At 9:00 a.m. eyewitnesses claimed some impatient attendees waiting in line were throwing trash at each other, crowd surfing and surging towards the ground's outer barriers. From approximately 9:15 a.m. to 9:45 a.m. numerous checkpoints including the festival's main entrance gate and a COVID-testing site were breached and bypassed prior to the grounds' first opening at 10 a.m., with no immediate evidence of recovery or the number of people who streamed in. A security guard was injured, and medics were needed for four more people.

Around 9:30 a.m., associates of HFD Assistant Chief and event emergency designee Michelle McLeod and the Chief of the closest fire district, Section 21, claimed the latter were denied venue access for a preparatory dry run of NRG Park by an employee at CSC, then again by their head of security, who gave the District Chief only a map to compensate. McLeod's request for radios was also denied, later supplanted with only a cellphone number, despite ScoreMore's own plans indicating it would be slow and unreliable due to extra network traffic.

At approximately 10:00 a.m., an eyewitness described seeing a crowd start to attempt pulling down barricades and rushing a checkpoint, igniting small fireworks and trampling a girl whose foot was stuck between the metal bars of a barricade, to which a guard responded by discharging his taser at them. Several injured concertgoers started being taken to the hospital that morning, a process that continued consistently throughout the afternoon. Starting at 11:00 a.m., crowds at both lines for merchandise vendors became so volatile that one shut down by 12:00 p.m., according to HFD logs, in an attempt to avoid endangering both those waiting and those working their tables.

At 12:17 p.m., prior to its scheduled opening at 1:00 p.m., staff lost control of another checkpoint, with the fence in the Green Lot being damaged due to an individual using bolt cutters. By 2:00 p.m. a VIP entrance completely broke down after at least 200 fans surged through its barricades and checkpoints, knocking over metal detectors and trampling several attendees. At least one person was injured, and by 2:30 p.m. at least six were detained for trespassing. Multiple eyewitnesses by this point described wristbanding, pat-downs, and directional posts being abandoned by many authority figures at the entrances or on the grounds, then alcohol and drugs seen in the possession of numerous attendees later that night, especially in the merchandise section.

By about 3:15 p.m. HPD were already starting to log dangerous crowd conditions, and an EMT dealing with an expected influx of people seeking medical help for overdoses said their understaffed medical teams progressively became overwhelmed with traumatic injuries by 8:15 p.m. to the point they had to stop documenting patients and start triage. After running out of medical equipment and naloxone (a drug used to treat opioid overdoses), treatment was delayed by at least 20 minutes for many patients after being declared unconscious while some medics on-hire that were not trained in CPR had to seek out audience members that were, only for them to give up trying as the crowds were too tightly packed for the procedure to be implemented properly. At 3:54 p.m. ParaDocs' logs indicated at least 54 patients had been treated by medical staff and crowd conditions were getting dangerous. At approximately 4:15 p.m. yet another gate was broken and breached by an estimated 150 participants. At 4:30 p.m. several eyewitnesses described injuries from several attendees attempting to climb over barricades to escape the crowd compression and mosh pits at the festival's secondary stage where Don Toliver was performing.

In a meeting between approximately 4 p.m. and 5 p.m. in Scott's trailer which included Chief Finner, Travis Scott (whom Finner initially claimed to The New York Times he knew personally then later clarified in a press conference to have only met twice which he said did not constitute a close relationship), and Scott's personal security manager Michael Brown, Finner claimed to have relayed concerns about the energy of the crowd and advised Scott's team to be cautious regarding their messaging on social media, including unplanned events during the festival, staying conscious of a challenging time with social unrest and the COVID-19 pandemic. Finner also recommended Brown contact his department in advance next time so that more coverage could be prepared for additional concerts, then thanked Scott for his support of Houston. Scott's lawyer Ed McPherson claimed subsequently that neither security nor best practices were ever discussed in what he characterized as a brief conversation to only wish Scott well.

At 6:55 p.m. HFD logged more than 100 people rushing the VIP gate heavily damaged from its breach four hours earlier, and 15 guards were moved from the main gate to the corridor between the front barricade and the mainstage to escort anyone away from that zone not allowed there, but no headsets were ever given to receive instruction nor radios for communication from supervisors. By 7:00 p.m. an attendee said she was being pressed against the barricades at the mainstage. By 8:39 p.m. at least five fans were lifted over pen barricades by security near the Chills stage.  Around this time video from a member of the crowd showed a person calling for help and another being assisted by security as they were examined.

Having never received any promised planning calls from ParaDocs' EMS Director or radios in their network, Union President Lancton said HFD, EMS, and PD were forced to respond on their own after hearing cross-traffic or from colleagues on their own radios of patrons needing help, being misdirected by security from gate to gate upon arrival. Disputing some claims, CEO Alex Pollak said ParaDocs did not provide radios for events they contracted with, directing responsibility for that communication problem to concert production staff. In addition, he insisted no CPR patient had to wait for care and they were prepared with enough supplies and the properly allotted 70 workers for an anticipated crowd size of 70,000. Pollak also clarified he was passing along information consistently from the medical tent where he was stationed to their dispatch in the command center and his organization had enough radios for his own dispatchers provided by the organizers, but their primary difficulty was in going into crowds to reach victims in time, as many attendees punched, kicked, harassed or blocked their dispatchers, many treating their efforts as a joke.

Scott was set to perform on the first night of the Astroworld Festival, with a countdown timer appearing thirty minutes before his set. Attendees cited by the Houston Chronicle, CNN, and ABC News said that as crowds from the last three of eight guest artists' concerts for Yves Tumor, Don Toliver and SZA at the grounds' only other stage, 'Thrills', finished prior to Scott's countdown, they boxed-in the crowd already waiting front-and-center at the 'Chills' stage solely being used that day for Scott's performance. With barriers, then the sound and lighting stands, followed by concessions just behind that initial crowd directly in front, they were left with nowhere to escape, and compression worsened until breathing became difficult.

An EMT told The Washington Post he had heard on his radio from other staff that people were being trampled as early as 9:00 p.m., having overheard discussions to shut down the concert early. He did not know why the show continued, deciding with several colleagues that it was too dangerous to enter the crush and attempt to help the injured. While event organizers had estimated that HPD had logged 5,000 non-ticket holders streaming in after the various breaches, with an approximate 55,000 total in attendance at 9:02 p.m. that night, NRG Park Manager Miller later told HCSCC Chairman of the Board Edgar Colón in a meeting on November 17 that Live Nation's scanner report indicated only 37,858 attendees with scanned tickets on the property, throwing those totals into doubt. By approximately 8:52 p.m. HPD logs indicated nearly 300 people had already been treated, which ParaDocs CEO Pollak said subsequently was not unusual in his practice for a crowd that size, detailing only two transports to hospitals prior to the crush which he also described as a minimal total by comparison to his past work.

Crush 

Scott was scheduled to start his set at 8:45 p.m., but did not take the stage until approximately 9:02 p.m., starting at approximately 9:06 p.m. with the opening song "Escape Plan". His appearance on the stage resulted in people pushing toward it, leading to a human crush. According to HFD Chief Sam Peña, at about 9:00 p.m. members of the crowd pressed forward and also surged from the sides, causing a crush near the stage; he added that the crush was not caused by obstructed exits but by issues close to the stage, where the crowd was tightly packed. As people struggled to stay on their feet, several began to fall, and many were injured. Panic grew as Scott started his second song of his set, the remaining escape routes shrank, and several attempted to climb over barricades.

At 9:11 p.m. the concert's Unified Command—which consisted of Houston police, festival security, festival production staff, ParaDocs dispatchers and Harris County Emergency Core dispatchers—reported the main stage had been compromised, instructing their helicopter to investigate, as video showed fans unable to escape from the area closest to the stage. As the breach was limited to a single section, an official advised standing by and waiting for concert management. At 9:12 p.m. a tightly packed group of fans in the crowd's southern quadrant began screaming for medical help.

Chief Peña said most of the deaths likely occurred after 9:30 p.m., but according to forensic analysis of dozens of videos from crowd experts for The Washington Post, later confirmed by legal representatives of several victims’ families, witness statements, and publicly available medical logs, at least one victim later declared deceased was seen falling under a mass of people right at the concert’s opening with no evidence he ever got upright again. Three others that also died were seen unconscious in a pile of fans by at least 9:16 p.m., one of whom had attempted to save two younger women’s lives.

Several veteran ParaDocs supervisors, including one trapped in the southern quadrant attempting to assist three concertgoers in critical condition while protected with a daisy chain formed by some attendees, told Business Insider the majority of the patients they were attempting to resuscitate did not have signs of physical trauma such as stepped-on faces or chests but had fixed and dilated pupils—signs of anoxia as a result of suffocation while on their feet, something they had never seen before after working at hundreds of festivals. Even for trapped concertgoers who remained upright, a local internal medicine physician confirmed to the Houston Chronicle that those who could not expand their diaphragms, causing blood flow to be restricted to the brain and heart, likely died within minutes as a result of cardiac arrest.

At 9:13 p.m. an officer reported multiple fans scaling a gate. At 9:16 p.m. multiple reports of breathing problems and people being trampled were heard sporadically on radio traffic but with no clear location. At 9:18 p.m. HPD logs and radio traffic indicated at least one crush injury and at  9:21 p.m. crowd compression, then at 9:23 p.m. some fans began climbing a speaker tower to escape the crush. During Scott's song "Butterfly Effect", a security guard recalled over a dozen terrified attendees screaming at him for help to pull them over the barricades, including one woman whose screams were ignored by two men on either side of her repeatedly elbowing her face as they jumped around.

One eyewitness told ABC News that she saw security guards reinforce crowd-control barricades by tying the supporting bars together as they began to buckle under the pressure. Disregarding protocol prohibitive to personal harm, an EMT contracted with ParaDocs described on TikTok an impossible situation of having to reject desperate concertgoers grabbing him to assist others he already knew were likely dead in the crowd, with music too loud for radio traffic to be heard and a crowd that did not care about those around them. Another recalled to Rolling Stone that he witnessed unconscious concertgoers being crowd-surfed out to safety.

Several attendees told KTRK-TV, the local owned-and-operated ABC station in Houston, that the piles of people in some areas became two bodies deep, and that some tried to help, only to be sucked further into the crowd. A victim filmed herself on the bottom of one of them, struggling to stay alive, and later posted the video to TikTok. Another victim described to the Associated Press how the desperation in the crowd eventually increased to "every man for himself". A HPD officer was then warned by an unidentified official on the radio that they were having structural issues that could be catastrophic. One concertgoer claimed on Twitter that security responded to his pleas for help by saying that they could not do anything to stop the show as the concert was streaming live.

An ICU nurse attending the concert who passed out twice from the pressure on her chest and back described her shock to CNN at the "feral" atmosphere, describing how people continued to trample those on the ground to get to the front despite their screams. Two guests in the rear disabled-accessible section told the Houston Chronicle they saw 50 to 60 people climbing two stories up onto the concert's projection screens with exposed wiring to escape the crush or for better views that were not stopped by authorities. A couple searching for missing shoes and a phone amid the chaos told The Washington Post they eventually found six phones, learning later that two belonged to those who had died. Some medical personnel, including former combat medics, recalled to USA Today that their colleagues wept while working on 11 young concertgoers in cardiac arrest at once in both an over-capacity medical tent and an unforgiving crowd.

Scott stopped the show for the first time at about 9:24 p.m., saying "Somebody passed out right here" towards the front of the stage. Other fans elsewhere continued screaming and waving to attract his attention, but the rapper began his next song. At approximately 9:27 p.m., Scott paused and hunched over after a song. While the crowd chanted his name, Scott stood up and walked to the right, pointing offstage, asking for more lights, then to "make some noise for my boy right there hanging in the tree". Meanwhile, some nearby concertgoers were still calling out for medics. Scott then told everyone to make a gesture with their middle fingers "because they are ready to rage", and continued.

At approximately 9:30 p.m., medical staff moved to someone lying unresponsive in front of a reserved section, then multiple barriers were reported compromised, and officials requested a drone get closer for clearer footage. Scott noticed an ambulance in the crowd, pointing and asking "What the fuck is that?" After telling the crowd "If everybody good, put a middle finger up to the sky", two members of Scott's entourage came onto the stage to have an indecipherable conversation for several seconds, after which he turned to the crowd again, asking twice and joined by one of the two others on stage the second time for "two hands in the sky". Many people complied, so he said, "Y'all know what you came to do, Chase B, let's go," continuing the concert with his song "Upper Echelon", telling the crowd that he wanted to hear the ground shake, then sending the two that were on stage to dive off and crowd-surf.

As Scott was starting to sing at approximately 9:34 p.m, a man yelled at a camera operator multiple times from the bottom of his media tower to stop the show, which was ignored. A woman soon joined him, climbing its ladder onto his platform to shout the same concerns of someone dead in the crowd. After also being ignored, the other concertgoer came up onto the platform to join her, but another audience member told them both that the crowd would take care of it. "People are fucking dying! I want to save somebody's life! That's somebody's kid!", he responded. The operator told both to get off the platform and continued to film. Meanwhile, multiple mayday requests from other operators went unheeded as the media towers they were trying to escape were being climbed by other desperate attendees themselves.

At approximately 9:35 p.m, a graduate assistant attending the concert who also worked as a firefighter and EMT confirmed not being able to find a pulse on a 22-year-old woman whose skin had turned greyish-blue as a result of cyanosis, and he attempted to revive her by pumping her chest while getting another attendee to breathe oxygen into her lungs. Relieved two ParaDocs medics had shown up by approximately 9:42 p.m, he quickly realized that not only had they not arrived with an oxygen bag or defibrillator, being told they had run out, but watched with horror as one's compressions were not being implemented properly while the other's backboard had no straps, then after propping that board up on a fence, the woman's unconscious body slid off and hit the ground head first. The victim died several days later at the hospital.

At approximately 9:42 p.m. Scott stopped performing "Skeletons" mid-song for his third and final time of the concert after noticing an unconscious attendee. Security team members provided aid, and he resumed the performance. A video showed an unconscious man being carried from the area.

At approximately 9:43 p.m., one of the victims who later died was confirmed by his attorney to be photographed in the medical tent with a disfigured face as a result of being stepped on by the crowd. During Scott's next song, "90210", a group of concertgoers in the crowd's western quadrant began a "Stop the show!" chant that its southern quadrant had tried 40 minutes prior, but their requests went unheeded. At 9:55 p.m. an audience member was seen dancing on the roof of a retrofitted golf cart being used by medical staff as an ambulance. Just prior to 10:00 p.m. eyewitnesses noted the initial crush seemed to be over, but things got chaotic again with the arrival of Drake, who joined Scott on the song "Knife Talk." Scott and Drake started the song "Sicko Mode" at approximately 10:08 p.m. before the show closed with the final song, "Goosebumps," after which Scott waved to the crowd while jogging offstage, saying "I love y’all. Make it home safe. Good night!"

Immediate response 
Right at the concert's opening, ParaDocs' chief dispatcher Jon Saltzman told Business Insider that Unified Command where he was stationed received reports of at least three attendees suffering smoke inhalation from the stage's fireworks; then, his radio check-ins to supervisors stationed at forward triage positions were responded to with what he deciphered to be at least three distinct reports of cardiac arrest, a number he and his colleagues had never seen before at any event they had worked. Overstepping his authority, Saltzman told the festival dispatcher at command to shut down the festival as they were in uncharted territory, then waited for a response he implied he never received.

At 9:18 p.m. was HFD's first log of an injury related to breathing issues and a perceived crush. At 9:21 p.m. staff among the event's private medical contractors were dispatched to the front of the crowd, confirming multiple injuries to the concert's Unified Command, but the concert continued. Concertgoers recorded staff performing CPR on unconscious attendees as early as 9:28 p.m. As medical personnel were overwhelmed in triage, audience members attempted to help perform CPR as well. Several people were administered naloxone.

At approximately 9:30 p.m. a panicked female officer asked for clear airwaves on radio traffic to report multiple trampled victims passed out at the medical tent, warning of thick, unruly, worsening crowd conditions that would likely affect officers attempting rescues. HFD District Chief Mo Koochak at his Orange Lot command post, who was never given a radio within ParaDocs' network, overheard her on cross-traffic on his own device.

At 9:33 p.m. police reported multiple victims trampled and passed out at the front of the stage, and over the next ten minutes, police operators fielded five 911 calls about unconscious people in the crowd and reports of possible CPR ongoing or needed. Upon confirmation from a deputy chief of a compressing crowd with several attendees staggering out experiencing panic attacks, and with no time to wait for ParaDocs for further consultation, Chief Koochak ordered an 'EMT Task Force' of sixteen units to mobilize to the scene.

At 9:38 p.m., a ParaDocs dispatcher at the concert's unified command relayed a mass-casualty incident to officials, a 'Level 1' event was declared by HFD dispatchers, and radio traffic for an undetermined amount of time for many officials became entirely unintelligible. HPD Assistant Chief Larry Satterwhite, with several officials, informed festival promoters that the show should not continue, but the Houston Chronicle reported Chief Finner, following what he later claimed was consultation with local officials, made the ultimate call to defer to festival management, production and the entertainer on the decision to halt the show, citing his department's lack of power. Several officials alleged to The New York Times that proper protocol was not followed numerous times from some workers in identifying suspected deceased victims by code name over the radio.

At about 9:40 p.m. the first HFD ambulances reached the gate directly behind the main stage, only to be diverted to another area in response to a cardiac arrest. A HPD official advised several inquiring HFD officials on the radio that the show would soon end, but the concert continued. From 9:40 p.m. to 9:50 p.m. some HFD firefighters witnessed five patients at the medical tent whose hearts had stopped.

At approximately 9:53 p.m., HFD officials upgraded the incident to a 'Level 2' event, sending 12 more units, and a mass-casualty declaration was first put into department logs. Scott's lawyer McPherson claimed that he believed Scott was informed just before 10:00 p.m. that the show would need to conclude by festival management via his in-ear monitors, which Scott claimed was only a message that the show must end after its guests appeared onstage for which he was not given a reason as to why the performance was being cut short. Radio traffic from a female officer overheard from several officials at approximately 10:03 p.m. claimed the show had been stopped, but Scott and Drake were still performing. Footage from the event emerged showing police officers near the stage pointing their phones at the stage, with the performance going on, at least fifteen minutes after the mass casualty event was declared.

At 10:13 p.m. the festival's first fatality was declared by doctors at Ben Taub Hospital. Scott finished at approximately 10:10 p.m. to 10:15 p.m. Some reports indicated he finished in full his originally planned 25-song set, while others indicated it had ended thirty minutes earlier than scheduled. From 10:46 p.m. to 11:18 p.m. seven others were pronounced dead by four other Houston hospitals. By 11:00 p.m. HFD officials had dispatched 55 of their own units to the scene, and called off any more of their paramedics from heading to the incident. At 12:20 a.m., approximately three hours after a mass casualty event was declared, came the first official announcement to the public of an "NRG Park incident" via the HPD's Twitter account.

Victims 
Eight victims, aged 14 to 27, died on the night of the concert. One of the injured, a 22-year-old woman, was declared brain dead on November 9 and died the next day. A 9-year-old boy was placed in a medically induced coma after being crushed and trampled at the concert, becoming the tenth fatality of the event when he died on November 14. It was the most accidental deaths at a U.S. concert since the Station nightclub fire which killed 100 people in West Warwick, Rhode Island in 2003.

Twenty-five people were evacuated to local hospitals that night. In all, more than 300 people were treated for injuries in the field hospital at the festival.

Aftermath 
Immediately following the concert, Scott went to a pre-scheduled, private after-party at a local Dave & Buster’s hosted by friend and co-performer Drake. They allegedly did not hear pleas to stop the concert at the grounds, first learning about the severity of the event at the restaurant and immediately leaving.

By 2:13 a.m. a reunification area for missing persons had been set up at the Wyndham Houston Hotel and authorities confirmed in a press conference at NRG Park the incident's initial death toll of eight victims. In its first statement of condolences at about 6:00 a.m. Astroworld clarified in a social media post that the second night of the festival on November 6 had been canceled. The incident and its fallout quickly gained widespread attention and the event was soon dubbed "Gen Z's Altamont" (1969).

Two days after the crush, a makeshift memorial for the victims was created on a chain link fence outside the festival area, with prayer candles, flowers, pictures of the deceased, and stuffed animals among the items left. A non-profit group from San Antonio provided therapy dogs at the scene. On November 21, the family of one of the ten dead victims had photos of the other nine that died printed and posted at the memorial as a gesture in support of the other families.

The Sunday Service Choir, an American gospel collective led by rapper and producer Kanye West, partnered with Triller and Revolt TV to hold a free live online worship service in memory of and tribute to those who died.

On November 14, Houston rapper Bun B and local restaurant Eatsie Boys hosted a local "Breaking Bread" event joined by Trae tha Truth, a local distillery and several food trucks that used their surplus supply originally intended for the remainder of the festival, donating a portion of sales to the victims and their families.

Reactions

Festival performers and companies 
In a statement posted on his social media the next day, Scott offered his condolences to those who died, and offered support to local authorities. Later that day, he posted a video response on Instagram stories that was quickly criticized by some outlets for its perceived insincerity and parodied on social media. Also that day, Kylie Jenner, Scott's girlfriend who attended the show, and her sister Kendall, deleted their social media posts related to the festival following heavy backlash. Both released subsequent statements expressing their sympathy, with Kylie indicating that she and Scott were unaware of the fatalities until afterwards, adding that had they known, they would not have continued filming or performing. Apple Music, who live streamed the event, deleted their social media posts related to the festival the next day and issued a statement commemorating the victims. On November 8, Drake released his first statement voicing similar sentiments to Scott. 

Live Nation in a statement said: "Our entire team is mourning alongside the community", and they were working on ways to support attendees, the families of victims, and staff with mental health counseling and help with hospital costs for the victims and their loved ones, promising refunds to all paying concertgoers. A 5.4% share price fall totaling more than $1 billion was wiped from Live Nation's stock value on the Monday following the incident, which company observers characterized as "modest", predicting shareholders would likely prioritize the long-term impact of litigation over prior concerns such as COVID-19 recovery and congressional inquiry into ticket scalping.

In an interview with Charlamagne tha God posted to YouTube on December 9 which Scott said he granted as he wanted a forum for public communication of his emotions, he said the media was forcing responsibility onto him as the face of the festival and that he was looking for solutions for future concerts, clarified that he did not know about any deaths until minutes prior to authorities' press conference the morning after the incident and that he had not heard any fans screaming for him to stop the concert, citing his ear-piece, and expressed regret about his initial Instagram video apology prior to more information being made public, understanding plaintiffs' denial of his offer for coverage of funeral costs. Multiple law firms for several victims who died heavily criticized the interview to several outlets as gaslighting, punting blame, and a pre-packaged public relations stunt from an artist that built his brand on an abusive relationship with his fans, arguing it increased his liability further with tacit acknowledgments of improper planning and willful ignorance by Scott's production team.

Donations and reimbursements 
American rapper Roddy Ricch and American singer Toro y Moi both announced that weekend they would be donating their net compensation for performing at the event to the victims' families.

Scott announced in a statement on November 8 that he would cover the costs of funerals as well as medical expenses for those killed at the festival. The Houston Chronicle reported on November 26 that attorneys for many of the victims told them not to accept his nor Live Nation's offers, and Rolling Stone on November 29 obtained a letter sent from lawyers representing the 9-year-old victim that died declining a request from Scott's new lawyer, Daniel M. Petrocelli, for either a meeting or reimbursement. Representatives for four other victims that died confirmed the next day they had also rejected or ignored similar offers from Scott's old and new legal teams, describing the gestures as demeaning attempts to lessen public pressure rather than a genuine display of remorse.

Scott's additional offer in his statement on November 8 of a month of free online therapy to people who attended the concert as part of an unpaid partnership with BetterHelp was met with criticism by some that considered the move insufficient, inauthentic and exploitative given its limit, opportunity for future sponsorship for Scott, the organization's past privacy controversies and notice their services weren't suitable for minors despite most of the concert's survivors being teenagers, while other mental health experts were hesitant to dismiss the move outright. On November 9, Scott posted the wrong telephone number to call for the therapy on his Instagram account from what he intended to be the hotline for the National Alliance on Mental Illness (NAMI) but was supposed to be a different dedicated national number NAMI created in partnership with BetterHealth. A reporter claimed early attempts at calling only reached a government agency scam while latter observers claimed to only reach a car insurance scam, and Scott only updated the number on his account two days after Buzzfeed News reached out to his team for comment.

Reports arose online by November 18 of rumors from several concertgoers alleging that any right to participate in a class-action lawsuit or arbitration against Live Nation would have to be waived if they wished to receive a ticket refund, with their only avenue through a company settlement outside of court. Lawyers that looked through the company's policies later clarified there were not any explicit qualifications in the terms of use and a sweeping waiver likely would not be upheld in court. Amidst the controversy, guidance for many concertgoers still had not been given weeks later as to how or when full refunds would be handled for attendees who had not planned to make legal filings and many also could not reach Front Gate Tickets — the official promoter and ticketing provider of the event.

Rolling Stone on December 17 obtained from a staffer hired for that night an email with an updated contract sent on November 15 from a manager working for Live Nation, ScoreMore, and XX Nation that contained a new clause which said they would not be reimbursed unless they agreed to a liability release to not sue, which he refused to sign.

Travis Scott sponsors and partnerships 
Variety reported on November 8 that Scott had cancelled his headlining appearance at the Day N Vegas Festival, slated for November 13 in Las Vegas, Nevada. The Houston Rockets pre-scheduled Travis Scott Day celebration for their November 10 home game against the Detroit Pistons was postponed out of sensitivity for the victims with a moment of silence observed instead and Scott and DJ Chase B's streetwear boutique at Rice Village in Houston closed indefinitely following the incident. Epic Games temporarily removed their Travis Scott Fortnite emote on November 7 and Nike announced the postponement of its early 2022 Air Max 1 x Cactus Jack footwear collab launch with Scott indefinitely in an email to users of its SNKRS app on November 15 out of respect for the victims. CEO of fashion house Dior Pietro Beccari told Women's Wear Daily (WWD) in a statement they were still evaluating the situation internally as of November 16 as to whether they would pull their entire spring/summer 'Cactus Jack Dior' menswear collection on which they collaborated with Scott, which experts to Rolling Stone indicated had likely already been manufactured in full for its distribution in January 2022. Parsons School of Design also confirmed to WWD they had decided not to renew a contract with Scott's Cactus Jack Design Center that had hosted online courses and provided scholarships in fashion and design for underserved students in Houston in partnership with the local chapter of non-profit My Brother's Keeper and TX/RX labs, who did not clarify to the outlet whether they would stay open as a result of the withdrawal either. As of November 17, General Mills confirmed to the Houston Chronicle they had no plans for future collaborations with Scott following their custom Reese's Puffs cereal box in 2019 and the outlet could not confirm the future of Scott's branding relationships with McDonald's, Sony PlayStation, Byredo, or Mattel.

W Media agreed with Scott and Kylie Jenner to withdraw online and in print prior to its release date soon after the concert their magazine cover and feature with their daughter Stormi. A representative for the Kardashian family denied allegations Scott had been cut from any storylines for their upcoming Hulu series, The Kardashians, stating he had not yet been filmed. A controversy with the streaming service arose on December 1 following their decision to post then remove in the same day a news special from KTRK-TV, "Astroworld: Concert from Hell". Confusion and backlash followed their perceived profiting from the partnership too soon following the incident as well as the impression Hulu had produced their documentary and it was not available after they removed it, even though it had been publicly available on the affiliate's website since November 24 after originally airing on television November 20. The affiliate's original news special was retitled to "Astroworld Aftermath" on December 2.

On December 10, trade publications Beer Business Daily and Beer Marketer's Insights reported Anheuser-Busch had informed its wholesalers of the decision to discontinue all production and development of their brand partnership with Scott, the CACTI Agave Spiked Seltzer, less than nine months after it first went on sale, speculating as to the incident being the cause given what they described as a significant sales dip prior. Ad Age reported that day the brand had its related Twitter account removed as well, having not posted since the incident, and a representative for Scott told the outlet his endorsement deal had expired November 30, characterizing the decision to cease their involvement as mutual, although a source allegedly connected to the brand claimed to TMZ it had not been discontinued but put on a temporary hold. That day Palm Springs ABC-affiliate KESQ reported a Change.org petition calling for Scott to be removed from the 2022 Coachella Valley Music and Arts Festival for which he was a headliner had received at least 60,000 signatures, then confirmed, citing reports from its host city Indio and its Community Services Manager Jim Curtis, that he was no longer on the bill. Variety reported the next day the festival informed Scott's agent Cara Lewis it intended to pull Scott from the bill and was willing to pay a 25% kill fee for the cancellation but that Lewis was trying to keep him on it, offering to forgo his entire performance fee as an incentive. On December 17 TMZ reported Scott was partnering with The United States Conference of Mayors (USCM) to create a safety report for live entertainment going forward with a focus on new innovation and technology, and on December 28 WWD reported Dior had indefinitely postponed their Cactus Jack capsule collaboration which was originally supposed to be included in their Summer 2022 collection. Following reports confirming Scott's removal from Coachella's roster in early January 2022 and rumors one of its headliners, Kanye West, would be featuring him regardless, another Change.org petition supporting Scott's return to the festival reached over 70,000 signatures in just three days by January 26, approximately 65,000 of which were removed the following day due to what website engineers cited as fraudulent activity, followed by its complete removal the day afterwards with no explanation as of January 28.

Despite the initial wave of cancellations and/or postponement of live performances and sponsorships, Travis Scott quickly re-emerged the following year in June with a performance at the 2022 Billboard Music Awards thanks to a self-described "demand" of the organization from its host and executive producer P. Diddy, who went on in a statement to blame cancel culture for Scott's initial backlash. Soon after, "not even a full year after Astroworld", 'Day N Vegas', the Las Vegas festival produced by Goldenvoice behind the Coachella festival that had originally withdrawn their concert slot to Travis announced he would be headlining the last day of their 2022 festival iteration (although the festival would later be canceled for reasons unrelated to Scott), following announcements from Primavera Sound in Brazil and Argentina that he would be headlining their festivals as well that November, including a concert in São Paulo just one day after the event's first anniversary. In addition, as of late May 2022, it was confirmed that Scott's new projects and releases with Nike and Dior would be moving forward.

Political and cultural responses 
On the night of the incident, Senator Ted Cruz (R-TX) described the events as horrific and said that there needed to be a very serious, credible, and objective investigation. The next day, Texas governor Greg Abbott said, "What happened at Astroworld Festival last night was tragic, and our hearts are with those who lost their lives and those who were injured in the terrifying crowd surge." On November 10, he announced the formation of the 'Texas Task Force on Concert Safety Panel' to begin the work of creating safety standards and guidelines for future events of this type in the state. Fellow Houston rapper Megan Thee Stallion announced that she had cancelled her local show scheduled for December 3 out of respect for the victims.

The legal counsel for several festivals, lawyers for past concert victims, and experts on past concert disaster task forces explained to several outlets substantial reforms weren't likely towards standing-room-only general admission tickets as assigned seating was unaffordable for smaller indoor venues and didn't make sense for outdoor festivals, arguing Astroworld's failures weren't a sweeping referendum on festival culture as a whole. However, organizers taking more responsibility for utilizing a 'stop show' more frequently and not equating that with a cancellation (despite the financial incentive) was seen as much more plausible, with the biggest roadblocks to that reform surrounding specialty hiring during a global labor shortage as a result of COVID-19, and the biggest opportunities including emerging technology such as crowd tension monitoring through heat maps of crowds overlaid on CCTV.

On November 19, rapper Chuck D of the hip hop group Public Enemy wrote an open letter to concert promoters defending Scott in which he expressed that as a young black man, Scott was being blamed for a crime while the "old white men running the corps" that Scott and his fans trusted with their lives "stay quiet in the shadows". He went on to argue that Scott was a performer that did not run logistics and questioned the perception in the public and press of Scott's past and present irresponsibility, saying Live Nation would not have promoted and partnered with him, then let him headline his own show in the first place if they were truly concerned. On November 22, policy was amended for just the San Bernardino, California, stop from December 10–12 of hip-hop festival Rolling Loud to only allow attendees 18 or older, alluding to the incident in a statement. Questions were raised in the press and from concertgoers subsequently as to why the policy was not implemented permanently for all Rolling Loud concerts going forward.

The Governor's Task Force on Concert Safety formed after the incident recommended in its final report issued on April 19, 2022 a solution to permitting loopholes as a result of discrepancies between Harris County and the city of Houston, a standardized event permitting process for the state of Texas which had led to "forum shopping" across event promoters prior, a universal permitting template with a standardized checklist for counties to consult before issuing them, unique contingency plans for events fans could easily breach, stampede, or overcrowd, clearly outlined triggers for pausing or canceling shows, integration of local first responders in the unified on-site command and control and greater prioritization in resources, application and training in risk management for staff and promoters in future events, clarifying there wasn't likely occupancy overloading issues that night but in crowd management. Mayor Turner and Precinct 2 Commissioner Adrian Garcia announced their own Special Events Task Force on February 9, 2022, for both Houston and Harris County with 10 other industry leaders to similarly review and make recommendations in improved communication, protocols and permitting requirements for future events only, later clarifying they weren't analyzing that night's events as it would interfere in ongoing investigations.

Investigation 
In the immediate aftermath of the incident, local homicide and narcotics investigators, representatives for the insurance companies of the defendants, OSHA, and lawyers for the concertgoers were on the scene. A judge's limited freeze order to pause cleanup of the site did not come until two nights later on November 8, allowing victims' lawyers to investigate and take photographs and requiring organizers to preserve remaining evidence after an agreement was reached with defendants, clarifying it did not waive their legal defenses entirely. Live Nation and ScoreMore said they were working with local authorities, investigators were inspecting the grounds, and CCTV video had been turned over. On November 8, FBI Director Christopher Wray confirmed to ABC News that his agency would be providing technical assistance to local investigators and FBI Houston branch spokesperson Brittany Davis clarified subsequently they were ready to assist, but city officials initially declined to divulge publicly whether the department had asked for the FBI's aid or accepted the help. On November 10, Chief Finner called the FBI a partner in the investigation, but clarified his department was taking the lead.

Police initially stated that a security officer allegedly fell unconscious after feeling a prick to his neck and that he had a puncture wound consistent with an injection. It was initially reported by The Wall Street Journal that part of the investigation into the deaths was to determine if drugs laced with fentanyl were taken by concertgoers and potentially contributed to the deaths of some. On November 8, HPD emphasized that the drugging theory was unconfirmed, while toxicology experts and concert attendees cast doubt on its validity. On November 9, Chief Finner confirmed that evidence of drugs on the festival grounds existed, but it was not clear what those drugs were. On November 10, Chief Finner confirmed the security guard who made the allegations was located and that his story was not consistent with the reporting of injected drugs, clarifying he was actually struck in the head and fell unconscious.

On December 16, the Harris County Institute of Forensic Science's medical examiner concluded the cause of death for all 10 victims was accidental compressive asphyxiation, with one of the 10 having a contributing cause as well from the combined toxic effects of cocaine, methamphetamine and ethanol in his system. Houston Police Department's homicide and narcotics divisions' investigation into the incident is still ongoing.

On December 22, the United States House of Representatives' Committee on Oversight and Reform announced the launch of a bipartisan investigation into Live Nation's role in the incident, requesting in a letter to its CEO Michael Rapino documents be overturned by January 7, 2022, related to reports including the company's withholding of pay for employees until they signed revised contracts that released them from liability, the delay in stopping the concert in the 40 minutes after a mass-casualty incident was declared, and improper training for the medical staff on-duty. The committee also requested Rapino attend their briefing on the matter on January 12. Variety reported on January 7, 2022, that Live Nation had begun providing relevant information in response to the committee's requests, the company had been granted an extension to complete their request and the briefing would likely take place in early February. On January 14, HPD announced on Twitter the establishment of a public-facing FBI website seeking photo and video from the main venue area that night between 8 and 11 p.m. which attendees could upload to their portal to capture all possible evidence for a complete investigation. A law enforcement expert working with one of the plaintiffs criticized the length of time it took for the department to launch the website to Rolling Stone while another lawyer tempered concerns the outlet presented that valuable data was gone forever given the time by clarifying plaintiffs likely already had it stored.

Jurisdiction discussions 
Lawyers for the victims and local officials, including Harris County judge Lina Hidalgo, proposed an independent investigation to avoid conflicts of interest, and Chief Finner indicated on November 10 he would be open to it if the HPD's investigation revealed there was a need, however, subsequent reporting indicated the ability of the county to take action had been complicated by Finner's announcement of his own investigation and by Scott's ties to and investment in the city. The latter was questioned by several outlets as to whether it factored into Scott being granted less scrutiny and more leeway regarding usual concert rules that night. Amid a conflict over jurisdiction between the city and the county on instituting additional permitting at NRG Park post-incident, Mayor Turner also said he would not wait for the county commissioners to institute changes before taking action on his own.

The following week, crowd management expert and head of L.A.-based Crowd Management Strategies, Paul Wertheimer, who served on a task force following The Who concert disaster (1979), argued to The Washington Post that only an independent commission would provide a satisfactory analysis and to Texas Monthly that until festival organizers were found criminally liable for their role in fatal disasters, a punishment he said rarely happened, no progress would be made towards preventing a future disaster. On November 15, despite what she described as public and private lobbying and clarification she did not wish to interfere with the HPD investigation, Judge Hidalgo could not get three votes on the Harris County Commissioners Board to have a county auditor pick a firm to do an assessment then give recommendations and best practices. Instead, Judge Hidalgo joined her colleagues for a unanimous vote for an internal review by Harris County Administrator David Berry of the safety practices at scheduled outdoor events at NRG Park, HCSCC and the Harris County Houston Sports Authority, in coordination with Mayor Turner's office and relevant departments. The commissioners' reasoning was initially unclear as executive sessions were not public, however, Commissioner Adrian Garcia, a former HPD officer, indicated prior to the session his concern about the county being exposed to liability from new revelations. Hidalgo later expressed her concerns on whether Administrator Berry would come back with actionable lessons that were not vague and soon forgotten. Local political observers noted Garcia's foresight as to the likely damage to his career had he granted an independent investigation.

Culpability discussions

Responsibility for stopping the show 
In response to inquiries about the 40-minute delay after a mass casualty declaration, Chief Finner later cited, in addition to his deference to festival authorities on the decision to stop the show, concerns about possible riots with a younger crowd, saying that "you cannot just close when you have over 50,000 individuals". Responding to eyewitness allegations of two large mosh pits several concertgoers attempted to form towards the front of the crowd, Finner similarly deferred to Live Nation on culpability. Numerous outlets and live entertainment experts disputed both explanations, citing clauses in Houston's charter for what qualified as an emergency as well as intermediate steps that could've been taken such as a longer show pause, partial evacuation, or emergency messaging on the speakers or video boards, none of which were utilized. Finner's reasoning as to why deference had to be given to festival organizers to stop the show was not clarified as of November 24.

Chief Peña told The New York Times on November 7 that he felt Scott and the organizers were the people responsible to stop the show, explaining that the one person who can really call for and get a tactical pause when something goes wrong is the performer, clarifying it would have been very helpful if Scott had said 'Hey, shut this thing down and turn on the lights until this thing gets corrected'. Chief Finner said on Twitter following a press conference on November 10 that HPD had told organizers to shut down the performance while at least one person was receiving CPR, but did not clarify when or whether the show stopped after police had made the request.

Scott’s spokesperson Stephanie Rawlings-Blake called Peña's claim ludicrous, citing the festival operations’ chain of command for Scott’s lack of authority to stop the show and a communications breakdown in an interview on CBS News, a statement whose logic was ridiculed in an opinion piece by Variety and called implausible. Scott’s lawyer Ed McPherson called Finner and Peña's claims blame-shifting and inconsistent to several outlets, citing the former's implied retraction of an initial claim that concerns about rioting explained the delay for their response, prior precedent with HPD shutting off power and sound at the 2019 iteration of the festival when it ran 5 minutes over, as well as video of Houston cops seen taking photos and video approximately 15 to 25 minutes after a mass-casualty event was declared. He also supported the initial reporting of his client’s lack of knowledge of the events that transpired until the following day and defended Scott’s calls to rage as simply a form of audience engagement, pointing to Scott’s attempts to help fans and distractions from the lights and his earpiece.

USA Today’s Editorial Board called Chief Finner’s initial claim of concern about rioting to explain the procedural delay in stopping the show inexplicable, noting the event was not a "sovereign entity, where emissaries negotiate a conclusion", and called for city or county officials who relinquished their authority to be properly investigated. Videos of other concerts being paused by artists such as Kurt Cobain, Adele, Kendrick Lamar, Rihanna, Dave Grohl, ASAP Rocky, Chris Martin, Mike Shinoda, and Lil Pump to address safety concerns and medical emergencies soon went viral in response to the incident. Artist SZA who finished her set at Astroworld at about 8:30 p.m. prior to Scott's countdown stopped her concert less than a week later in Salt Lake City due to someone fainting in the audience, insisting her team bring them water, and arguing during the break for a culture shift for shows going forward.

Contractor and patron issues 
In Facebook posts made during and immediately after the event, Houston security director for CSC Jason Huckabey blamed festival attendees, who he called "idiots...from 15-22 in age," while attributing deaths to a generation that "has no value in other peoples lives" and "waves of dumbasses breaking down fences trying to rush in" while his guards tried to halt them.

Describing the events as an impossible feat for which he would have nightmares the rest of his life, ParaDocs CEO Pollak defended his on-hand event staff of more than 70 to reporters on November 15, emphasizing his firm did not have the ability to stop the concert which he felt personally should have been done earlier, but understood early concerns about possible rioting. He later described to the Houston Chronicle highlighting to his staff in a meeting after the concert the three patients they had helped regain blood pressure and a pulse, expressing personally that no one likely could have done a better job, and repeated his insistence they had enough medical equipment for the show, comparing it to a festival for 270,000 that had worked smoothly a weekend later.

HFD Deputy Chief Isaac Garcia, who had lobbied for years with his union with little success to mandate a greater presence of their firefighters at larger events, told USA Today that no communication opportunities by radio or in pre-planning left them with no recourse but to assume ParaDocs was being overrun, at which point any of their recovery efforts would come too late and likely have been in vain.

Lawsuits 
Attorneys representing the deceased, injured, and traumatized fans stated in court documents that organizers were motivated by profit at concertgoers' expense and should have foreseen the potential for a disastrous outcome. The attorneys of the injured and traumatized security guards stated in court documents that their hiring companies lied about their compensation and failed to provide a safe workplace or basic training. Over 50 defendants were involved, including Travis Scott and Drake (as Drake joined Scott in his headline set), Scott's company Jack Enterprises (as well as personal foundation and label Cactus Jack), the concert's streamer Apple Music, concert promoters (including Live Nation Entertainment, The Bowery Presents LLC and ScoreMore Holdings LLC), venues and security firms (including ASM Global, XX Global Inc., AJ Melino & Associates, Contemporary Services Corporation, ParaDocs Worldwide, Strike Force Protective Services, NRG Energy, NRG Park, Valle Security Services, Tri Star Sports & Entertainment Group and the Harris County Sports & Convention Corporation), other record labels behind production (Epic Records and Grand Hustle Records), and various other producers, promoters, subcontractors, and public relations officials. Neither Houston nor Harris County were sued, which plaintiff Tony Buzbee explained to Texas Monthly was common practice for lawyers in the state given the historical difficulty of successful cases against those entities as a result of the Texas Tort Claims Act. The most prominent counsel retained by high-profile defendants included Susman Godfrey representing Live Nation, Norton Rose Fulbright representing ASM Global, and Daniel Petrocelli representing Travis Scott.

According to the ACORD certificate of liability insurance for NRG Park that was filed with the city of Houston and subsequently obtained by TMZ, NRG Park had $1 million in primary coverage with umbrella coverage of $25 million. The news outlet reported that as of November 9 there was not any evidence of other coverage, and speculated regarding which parties would be held responsible and possibly have to file for bankruptcy if insurance coverage turns out to be inadequate to pay out all the claims. While some involved lawyers that spoke to the Houston Chronicle on November 26 were eager to learn how much the named defendants had in insurance coverage, others agreed with prior concerns raised regarding the likelihood of bankruptcy filings resulting from the large damage amounts sought from defendants ultimately leading to less compensation for victims. Plaintiff Chad Pinkerton, who had previously fought in court against Live Nation in the 2017 Las Vegas shooting, said that based on the defendant's choice of legal counsel, they were preparing for high-stakes, "bet-the-company" litigation, estimating they likely had about $200 million in general insurance coverage with another $100 million in premises liability insurance, the security firms had about $20 million in insurance, and it was unclear how much insurance coverage Scott had, if any.

In the weeks following the incident, Houston NBC affiliate KPRC-TV reported a sharp increase in digital and television ads for personal injury lawyers seeking Astroworld victims who still had not filed, and, inferencing that not all of these were created with the victims' best interests in mind, warned prospective clients of fraud, providing tips on protecting private information.

Active litigation

Pre-trial pre-gag order
As of December 3, 2021, more than 275 civil wrongful death, personal injury, and premises liability lawsuits had been filed from more than a dozen law firms, including Civil rights attorney Ben Crump and attorney Tony Buzbee, representing more than 1,250 people seeking billions in total damages. Buzbee told Rolling Stone that neither the authorities nor organizers were incentivized to stop the show because of the money at stake, stating that if the performance itself had been interfered with, their reactions would have been vastly different. On December 6, attorney Brent Coon and crowd surge expert Dr. G. Keith Still announced a lawsuit on behalf of another 1,547 concertgoers seeking a further $10 billion in damages, pushing for legislative steps to mandate both certification of events from crowd control specialists and training programs for workers, and stricter criminal liability for errors in live entertainment going forward.

TMZ obtained legal documents that day indicating Travis Scott's first general denial to a civil suit from one concertgoer, which asked that the charges be dismissed with prejudice as they pertained to himself, his foundation, and his company. A representative for Scott confirmed a similar sweeping request for dismissal for 11 current and potentially all future cases shortly afterwards, while Live Nation, ScoreMore, and HCSCC all denied the allegations against them in legal filings. Coon described Scott's denial and request for dismissal as standard for this kind of case, while plaintiff James Lassiter, representing the family of the 22-year-old victim that died, condemned Scott's motion as astonishing and shameful.

After filings from Brent Coon & Associates raising concerns on discussions to consolidate the cases were withdrawn, on January 26, 2022, the Texas Judicial Panel On Multidistrict Litigation (MDL) granted joint motion from both victims and organizers that the then 387 separate lawsuits representing nearly 2,800 alleged victims (which had previously been placed before over a dozen different Harris County judges) as well as any subsequent tag-along cases be combined down to a single case before one judge. Both parties requested Judge Lauren Reeder of the 234th District Court of Harris County oversee the MDL for reasons not disclosed, and the order did not disclose which state judge would be handling the case.

Pre-trial post-gag order
On February 15, 2022, 11th District Court Judge Kristen Hawkins, previously assigned by the Judicial Board to handle all civil pretrial matters to avoid scheduling issues, conflicting rulings, or duplicative findings and evidence, issued a sweeping gag order for all involved parties restricting public comment on the character of any persons involved in the trial that would be inadmissible in a court of law (despite no request from any for the motion), citing the "volume of pre-trial and in-trial publicity" and the "right to a fair trial by an impartial jury". The motion does not affect the ongoing criminal investigation where no charges have yet been filed, but several local legal observers noted a likely chilling effect. On the first pretrial hearing on March 1, 2022, concertgoers suing were placed into four main categories: those who were killed, those who suffered traumatic brain injury, those with bodily injury and those with PTSD.

On March 9, 2022, an emergency motion was filed with the court by representatives of the 9-year-old victim to either cover Travis Scott under the gag order or rescind it entirely for a level playing field among the parties, as the day before Scott had announced his new initiative Project HEAL with a $5 million funding commitment for his Cactus Jack foundation towards his HBCU scholarship fund, an expansion of Houston’s CACT.US Youth Design Center, mental health coverage for minority and low-income and minority youth, and the funding of the U.S. Conference of Mayors Task Force of Event Safety he had partnered with earlier. A relative of the victim similarly argued to Rolling Stone Scott's announcement was a PR effort to sway jurors before they were even assembled, and Scott's spokesperson called the plaintiff's filing a shameful and cynical publicity stunt. On March 10, Scott's lawyers argued in a filing for Scott's 1st amendment right to speak publicly about his philanthropic work, and on March 11, the victim's lawyer replied in a filing their concerns were not with donations but his marketing campaign of reputation repair. At a March 28 emergency motion hearing, no motions, including filings on the gag order, sealing of autopsy records, case management, nor leadership structure disagreements regarding inclusiveness versus local experience to assign a liaison counsel between either plaintiffs Benjamin Crump or Sean Roberts, were ruled upon.

Defendants for Live Nation argued in a legal filing on April 8 that the documentary "Concert Crush: The Travis Scott Festival Tragedy", if released in several Texas cities for a limited one-week run (despite being available later for rental online), could taint the jury pool but did not request its release be blocked, which a lawyer for a victim responded to in a filing questioning their motives. Major plaintiff's claims without secondary verification from other authorities as a result of the gag order thus far have included a May 9, 2022 legal filing detailing 732 claims tied to injuries that required extensive medical treatment, 1,649 tied to less extensive treatment, and 2,540 claims for injuries where the severity was still under review, in addition to a suit filed in December 2021 but not reported until May 2022 from a woman who claimed that as a result of being trampled at the concert that she had lost her unborn child.

Settled litigation 
Tony Buzbee's's law firm announced on Thursday, October 20, 2022 the settlements with several defendants of two lawsuits brought by two victims who died from the concert's incident for confidential terms and damages.

See also 
 List of human stampedes and crushes

Notes

References 

2021 disasters in the United States
2021 in Houston
 
Concert disasters
Crowd collapses and crushes
Disasters in Texas
November 2021 events in the United States
Human stampedes in 2021
Human stampedes in the United States